The 2021 Big West Conference men's volleyball tournament is a postseason men's volleyball tournament for the Big West Conference during the 2021 NCAA Division I & II men's volleyball season. It was held April 22 through April 24, 2021 at the SimpliFi Arena at Stan Sheriff Center in Honolulu, Hawaii. The winner received the conference's automatic bid to the 2021 NCAA Volleyball Tournament.

Seeds
All six teams were eligible for the postseason, with the top two seeds receiving byes to the semifinals. Teams were seeded by record within the conference, with a tiebreaker system to seed teams with identical conference records.

Schedule and results

Bracket

References

Big West Conference Men's Volleyball Tournament
Tournament
Big West Conference men's volleyball tournament
Big West Conference men's volleyball tournament